Wang Chan (Hangul: 왕찬; born 7 September 2000) is a South Korean badminton player. As a junior player, Wang have won a silver in the boys' doubles and a bronze in the mixed doubles at the 2018 World Junior Championships. He also won bronze medals in the boys' doubles in the 2017 and 2018 Asian Junior Championships, and a silver in the mixed doubles in 2018. He also helps Korean junior team to clinched the mixed team title at the 2017 Asian Junior Championships.

Career 
Wang began his career as a badminton player since in the elementary school, and has been making achievements since his junior career. He educated at the Seoul Physical Education High School, and was selected to join the national team to compete in the 2017 Asian Junior Championships, and managed to win a gold medal in the mixed team event and a bronze in the boys' doubles. In 2018, he won the boys' doubles title at the German Junior International. He later played at the 2018 Asian Junior Championships, clinched a mixed doubles silver and a boys' doubles bronze at that tournament.

Achievements

World Junior Championships 
Boys' doubles

Mixed doubles

Asian Junior Championships 
Boys' doubles

Mixed doubles

BWF World Tour (2 runners-up) 
The BWF World Tour, which was announced on 19 March 2017 and implemented in 2018, is a series of elite badminton tournaments sanctioned by the Badminton World Federation (BWF). The BWF World Tours are divided into levels of World Tour Finals, Super 1000, Super 750, Super 500, Super 300 (part of the HSBC World Tour), and the BWF Tour Super 100.

Men's doubles

References

External links 
 

2000 births
Living people
South Korean male badminton players